Ellen Brandom (born March 29, 1942) is an American politician who served in the Missouri House of Representatives from the 160th district from 2007 to 2013.

References

1942 births
Living people
People from Quincy, Illinois
Women state legislators in Missouri
Republican Party members of the Missouri House of Representatives
21st-century American women